is a train station located in Sakyō-ku, Kyoto, Kyoto Prefecture, Japan.

Lines
Eizan Electric Railway (Eiden)
Kurama Line

Layout
The station has one platform serving one track.

Adjacent stations

Railway stations in Kyoto Prefecture
Railway stations in Japan opened in 1928